Little Darby Island Airport  is a private use airport located near Little Darby Island, the Bahamas.

See also
List of airports in the Bahamas

References

External links 
 Airport record for Little Darby Island Airport at Landings.com

Airports in the Bahamas